Miguel Paulo Detera Angeles (born October 27, 1997) is a Filipino actor, singer and dancer. Angeles is a talent of ABS-CBN under Star Magic. Angeles was first seen on TV via Mirabella, a Philippine melodramatic fantasy television series in 2014. In 2015, Angeles became a member of It's Showtime's Kilig Ambassadors: Hashtags.

Personal life
Angeles is continuing his studies at Trinity University of Asia, taking up BS Marketing.

Filmography

Film

Television

Awards and nominations

References

External links

1997 births
Living people
Star Magic personalities
ABS-CBN personalities
Filipino male film actors
Filipino male dancers
Filipino male television actors